The Crew is a comic book series published by Marvel Comics featuring teams of primarily dark-skinned superheroes banding together in New York City to fight injustice. 

The first series was published in 2003 and ran for seven issues. The series was written by Christopher Priest and illustrated by Joe Bennett. The second series, a revival known as Black Panther and the Crew, was published in 2017 and ran for six issues. It was written by Ta-Nehisi Coates and illustrated by Butch Guice.

Publication history

2003 series 
According to writer Christopher Priest's pitch, The Crew was about four hardened heroes who had all lost their families, four men who came together initially out of self-interest, but would soon discover their commonality of loss. The Crew was all in one way or another orphans. These men were dedicated to their respective goals, but each had a hole in his center. The seven stories released prior to cancellation were introductory pieces, breaking down the lives and pain of each member and the universe they lived in. If the series had continued, it would have highlighted each man's personal evolution to his "state of grace."

The bulk of the first story arc, Big Trouble In Little Mogadishu, was focused on the origin of Josiah X, son of Isaiah Bradley from Truth: Red, White & Black. Writer Priest intended that Josiah would eventually lead the team.

2017 series 
After the success of his run on Black Panther, Coates launched the spin-off title Black Panther and the Crew, a revival of the 2003 series. 

Coates originally wanted to use the same characters from the 2003 series, but found that a number of them weren't available. After selecting a new Crew, he ultimately added two female members — Misty Knight and Storm. Poet Yona Harvey also contributed to the series (as she did on another short-lived Black Panther spin-off, World of Wakanda). Black Panther and the Crew ran six issues before being canceled due to low sales.

Plot

2003 series 
The Crew takes place in the No man's land between the streets of the fictional "Little Mogadishu" and those of the fictional exclusive gated community of "Princeton Walk" in Brooklyn, New York. Princeton Walk was developed by multimillion-dollar investments and tax incentives to Grace & Tumbalt, a largely black-owned corporation, who cleaned up a section of Brooklyn and moved the criminal element and the poverty line residents out. Little Mogadishu, or "The Mog," as the locals call it, is a side effect of the gentrification process so that displaced criminal and poverty elements are now concentrated in a war zone outside Princeton Walk's walls.

Jim Rhodes, formerly War Machine but now down on his luck, came to Little Mogadishu to look into the murder of his estranged sister, and when it became apparent that the police were not going to get any results, he took the matter into his own hands. He delivered the men responsible for his sister's murder to the police in a neatly tied up package for them, coming across the local Muslim preacher Josiah X along the way. However, this was not enough to satisfy Rhodey, and he set his sights on the 66 Bridges leader, Triage. His covert, vigilante action and contact with Josiah put him on Kasper Cole's radar, making Kasper suspicious of what a guy like Rhodey was doing in a place like the Mog.  Rhodey hit Little Mogadishu like a force of nature, derailing the secret money train that delivered bribes in bulk to a large number of corrupt officials. This action drew in Junta, who smelled the opportunity to leverage his way back into the spy business if he could get a piece of the action. He found himself drafted into Rhodey's plan along with Kasper Cole and eventually a reluctant Josiah X.

Together, the Crew blackmailed a long list of corrupt officials to turn in evidence against 66 Bridges and Triage and then went after Triage directly. As Triage was no lightweight, the situation got messy and some of the Crew had to decide between their self-interests and being heroes. For Josiah, the decision to do the right was simple and instant. Junta reluctantly turned Triage into the authorities, blowing his chance to use Triage to get back in with his former bosses. Kasper Cole kept busy saving lives as the White Tiger, sacrificing his chance to get in on the big bust as Kasper Cole and further his police career.

The Crew apparently did not remain together after this event. Rhodey soon went back to being War Machine, and Josiah was said to have disappeared.

While many of the characters in The Crew were members of racial minorities in the United States, Priest chose not to center The Crew around race relations: 

Nonetheless, critics have called Priest's The Crew, "The blackest superhero story that Marvel Comics ever published."

2017 series 
Black Panther and the Crew takes place in the context of All-New, All-Different Marvel. Following Black Panther's gathering of evidence of outside influences fueling dissent in Wakanda, T'Challa calls on Luke Cage, Misty Knight, Storm, and Eden Fesi. Luke Cage describes the group as "The Crew". The series is set in Harlem and the plot is set into motion by an episode of police brutality.

Characters

Original Crew
 Junta — Daniel "Danny" Vincent, freelance intelligence agent and con man
 Justice — Josiah "Josiah X" Bradley, son of Isaiah Bradley, the black Captain America
 Kasper Cole — Kevin "Kasper" Cole, the White Tiger, is heir-in-waiting to the title of Black Panther
 War Machine — Jim Rhodes, former United States Marine and friend of Iron Man

Black Panther and the Crew
 Black Panther — T'Challa, King of Wakanda, member of The Avengers
 Eden Fesi — also known as Manifold; aboriginal Australian mutant with the ability to bend time and space, connecting one piece to another and allowing him to teleport
 Luke Cage — Hero for hire
 Misty Knight — former NYPD officer, now private investigator with bionic prosthetic arm
 Storm — Ororo Munroe, mutant and member of the X-Men

See also
Truth: Red, White & Black

Notes

References

 (2003)
 (2003)
 (2003)
 (2017)

External links
 The Crew at Marvel.com

 The Crew by Christopher Priest

2003 comics debuts
2004 comics endings
2017 comics debuts
2017 comics endings
African-American superheroes
Comics set in New York City
Marvel Comics superhero teams
Black Panther (Marvel Comics)